The Lambda Literary Award for Lesbian Fiction is an annual literary award, presented by the Lambda Literary Foundation to a work of fiction on lesbian themes. As the award is presented based on themes in the work, not the sexuality or gender of the writer, men and heterosexual women may also be nominated for or win the award.

Recipients

References

External links

 Lambda Literary Awards

Lesbian
English-language literary awards
Lists of LGBT-related award winners and nominees